Yul Chibuike Daniel Edochie  popularly known as Yul Edochie (born 7 January 1982)  is a Nigerian actor, named after Russian actor Yul Brynner. He is from Anambra state Nigeria, the son of Nigerian actor Pete Edochie.

He was raised both in Lagos and Enugu. He is the last of six children. He got married at the age of 22. He attended the University of Port Harcourt, where he received a Bachelor of Arts in Dramatic Arts.

Personal life 
Edochie is married to May Aligwe and has three sons and a daughter. Their names are Kambi Edochie, Dani Edochie, Karl Edochie and Victory Zane Chukwubuike Yul Edochie. On April 27, 2022, the actor revealed that he had taken fellow actor, Judy Austin, as his second wife, as well as their newborn son. This news was met with backlash from many colleagues and fans, and a show of support from others.
  Give aspiring actors a chance to show case their talent, you can find me on Facebook, light perfect

Career 
Edochie joined Nollywood in 2005 in his first film titled The Exquires alongside Justus Esiri and Enebeli Elebuwa. He got his break in 2007 after featuring alongside Genevieve Nnaji and Desmond Elliot in the movie Wind Of Glory.

In 2015, Edochie opened a film academy in Lagos. The academy gives talented people the opportunity to be introduced to the Nigerian Film Industry.

Politics 
On the 14 July 2017, Edochie declared his intention run for Governor of Anambra State. This declaration was made in anticipation of a not too young to run bill passed by the senate of the federal government of Nigeria. The declaration was however made official on the 22nd of August 2017, when he picked up the nomination form of the Democratic Peoples Congress political party and was eventually the flag bearer and gubernatorial candidate of the party to run for governor of Anambra State. Yul Edochie has declared his intention to run for the post of the President of Nigeria in the 2023 presidential elections.

Filmography

Television 
 The Palace
 Royal Castle
 Tinsel

Awards

References

External links 
 
 Yul Edochie on Instagram
 Yul Edochie Film Making Class

Nigerian actor-politicians
University of Port Harcourt alumni
Living people
Igbo television personalities
Male actors from Anambra State
1982 births
Igbo male actors
21st-century Nigerian male actors
Nigerian male film actors
Actors from Anambra State
Nigerian politicians
Nigerian film directors